The Robert B. Lewis Stakes is a Grade III American Thoroughbred horse race for three year old  horses at the distance of one and one-sixteenth miles on the dirt held annually in late January or early February at Santa Anita Park in Arcadia, California.

History

Inaugurated as the Santa Catalina Handicap in 1935, there was no race in 1936. Upon its return in 1937, it was run as the Santa Catalina California-Bred Championship Stakes until 1940 when it was renamed the Santa Catalina Nursery Stakes and was a three-furlong race for two-year-olds. In 1941 it reverted to its original name, the Santa Catalina Handicap and remained as that until 1964 when it became the Santa Catalina Stakes. In 2007, the race was renamed again in order to honor the prominent racehorse owner Robert B. Lewis, who had died in 2006.

Due to restrictions and consolidations during World War II, there was no race held from 1942 through 1944.

Until 1964, the race was open to horses three years of age and older with the exception of 1940.

The race has been run at a variety of distances:
 1935 : 1 mile
 1937-1938, 1941, 1945-1946, 1953, 1964-1969, 1971-2010, 2012 to present :  miles
 1939, 1947-1952, 1954-1963, 2011 :  miles
 1940 : 3 furlongs (for 2-year-olds)
 1970 : 7 furlongs

The Robert B. Lewis Stakes is one of the key prep races leading to the Santa Anita Derby each year and is part of the Road to the Kentucky Derby.

Records
Time record: (at the current distance of  miles)
 1:40.76 - Crown of Thorns (2008)

Most wins by an owner:
 3 - Elmendorf Farm (1977, 1980, 1982)

Most wins by a jockey:
 7 - Bill Shoemaker (1962, 1969, 1970, 1975, 1980, 1986, 1988)
 7 - Laffit Pincay Jr. (1971, 1972, 1973, 1976, 1981, 1985, 1989)

Most wins by a trainer:
 11 - Bob Baffert (1999, 2003, 2009, 2013, 2015, 2016, 2019, 2020, 2021, 2022, 2023)

Winners

*Run in two divisions in 1980. In 1981, Minnesota Chief won the race in record time but was disqualified and set back to second.

See also
Road to the Kentucky Derby
List of American and Canadian Graded races
Ten Things You Should Know About the Robert B. Lewis Stakes at Hello Race Fans!

References

February 21, 1990 New York Times article on the creation of the Preview Stakes
Robert B. Lewis Stakes at Pedigree Query

1935 establishments in California
Horse races in California
Santa Anita Park
Flat horse races for three-year-olds
Triple Crown Prep Races
Graded stakes races in the United States
Grade 3 stakes races in the United States
Recurring sporting events established in 1935